Leon Frank Litwack (December 2, 1929 – August 5, 2021) was an American historian whose scholarship focused on slavery, the Reconstruction Era of the United States, and its aftermath into the 20th century. He won a National Book Award, the Pulitzer Prize for History, and the Francis Parkman Prize for his 1979 book Been In the Storm So Long: The Aftermath of Slavery. He also received a Guggenheim Fellowship.

After the spring 2007 semester he retired to emeritus status at the University of California, Berkeley, where he received the Golden Apple Award for Outstanding Teaching that year. Then he went on a lecture tour that led to his latest book, How Free Is Free? The Long Death of Jim Crow (2009).

Biography
Litwack was born in Santa Barbara, California, in 1929, the son of Minnie (Nitkin) and Julius Litwack. His Jewish parents had emigrated separately from Russia in the first decade of the 20th century and met in San Francisco. He received his BA in 1951 and PhD in 1958 from the University of California, Berkeley.  He taught at the University of California at Berkeley and at the University of Wisconsin, University of South Carolina, Louisiana State University and Colorado College.

Litwack's interest in history was sparked by The Growth of the American Republic, by Samuel Eliot Morison and Henry Steele Commager (1930).  Litwack said, 

Historian Michael Les Benedict wrote that in 1961 "Leon Litwack showed how the federal government's pervasive support for slavery led to shameful treatment of free African Americans." Benedict was referring to pages 30–63 of chapter 2, titled "The Federal Government and the Free Negro" in Litwack's book, North of Slavery: The Negro in the Free States, 1790-1860.

In 1964–2007 Litwack taught at the University of California in Berkeley, where he became the Alexander F. and May T. Morrison Professor of American History, instructing more than 30,000 students.  For much of that time he taught the introductory course in post-Civil War American History.  He gave his final lecture as a professor, "Fight the Power", on Monday, May 7, 2007, in Wheeler Auditorium.

Litwack was elected to the presidency of the Organization of American Historians. An enormously popular and influential teacher, he was profiled in Newsweek's 2006 edition of the "Giving Back Awards", having been nominated by one of his former students. He has received two distinguished teaching awards. Litwack was presented with the Golden Apple Award for Outstanding Teaching in 2007 by the ASUC at the University of California, Berkeley.

With a (National Endowment for the Humanities) NEH Film Grant, he produced To Look for America in 1971.

Been in the Storm So Long was a groundbreaking book on Reconstruction, published in 1979. It won the annual Pulitzer Prize for History and Francis Parkman Prize; next year its first paperback edition won a National Book Award.

Years later he continued the investigation of race relations to the early 20th century with Trouble in Mind (1998). In turn, the sequel to Trouble is How Free Is Free?: The Long Death of Jim Crow (The Nathan I. Huggins Lectures), which focuses on black southerners and race relations from the 1930s to 1955.

A distinguished lecturer with the Organization of American Historians, Litwack lectured on these topics:

  Pearl Harbor Blues: Black Americans and World War II
  Trouble in Mind: African Americans and Race Reflections from Reconstruction to the Civil Rights Movement
  On Becoming a Historian
  To Look for America: From Hiroshima to Woodstock (an impressionistic multi-media examination of American society, with an introductory lecture on American society after 1945)
  Fight the Power: Black Americans and Race Relations after the Civil Rights Movement

Litwack died of bladder cancer on August 5, 2021, in Berkeley.

Selected works

Books
 North of Slavery: The Negro in the Free States, 1790-1860 (University of Chicago Press, 1961)
 The American Labor Movement by Leon Litwack (1962) 
 Been in the Storm So Long: The Aftermath of Slavery. (1979) — winner of the National Book Award and the Pulitzer Prize for History
 Trouble In Mind: Black Southerners in the Age of Jim Crow (Alfred A. Knopf, 1998)
 Without Sanctuary: Lynching Photography in America, edited by Hilton Als, Jon Lewis, Leon F. Litwack and James Allen (Twin Palms Publishers, 2000) 
 The Harvard Guide to African-American History, edited by Evelyn Brooks Higginbotham, Darlene Clark Hine and Leon F. Litwack (Harvard Univ Press, 2001)  — compiles information and interpretations on the past 500 years of African American history, containing essays on historical research aids, bibliographies, resources for women's issues, and an accompanying CD-ROM providing bibliographical entries
 How Free Is Free?: The Long Death of Jim Crow. The Nathan I. Huggins Lectures (Harvard University Press, 2009) 

Articles
 "The Blues Keep Falling", in Ethnic Notions: Black Images in the White Mind (Berkeley Art Center, 1982).
 "Hellhound on My Trail: Race Relations in the South from Reconstruction to the Civil Rights Movement", in Opening Doors: Perspectives on Race Relations in Contemporary America (Tuscaloosa: University of Alabama Press, 1991), 3–25.
 "Telling the Story: The Historian, the Film Maker, and the Civil War", in Robert B. Toplin (ed.), Ken Burns' Civil War: The Historians' Response (Oxford University Press, 1995).
 "The Making of a Historian", in Paul A. Cimbala and Robert F. Himmelberg, Historians and Race: Autobiography and the Writing of History (Bloomington, 1996).
 "Pearl Harbor Blues", Regards Croises Sur Les Afro-Américains / Cross Perspective on African Americans (University of Tours, France, 2003), 303–318.

Film
To Look for America (1971)

Notes

References

External links
Leon Litwack profile, U.C. Berkeley
Interview with Leon F. Litwack, History Matters
Leon Litwack profile, San Francisco Chronicle (includes photo)

Stuart A. Rose Manuscript, Archives, and Rare Book Library, Emory University: Southern California religious and fraternal collection, 1905-1922 (Collected by Leon Litwack)

1929 births
2021 deaths
21st-century American historians
21st-century American male writers
American textbook writers
American male non-fiction writers
Historians of slavery
Historians of the Reconstruction Era
Historians of race relations
National Book Award winners
Pulitzer Prize for History winners
University of California, Berkeley College of Letters and Science faculty
Writers from Santa Barbara, California
Berkeley Student Cooperative alumni
Historians from California
American people of Russian-Jewish descent
Jewish American historians
Deaths from bladder cancer
21st-century American Jews
Deaths from cancer in California